Wang Yani (1975) is a Chinese artist who began painting at the age of two-and-a-half. Her work was exhibited in China when she was four, appeared on a postage stamp when she was eight, and she had a solo exhibition at a museum in London when she was fourteen, and soon after, at the Arthur M. Sackler Gallery at the Smithsonian Institution, in a traveling exhibit organized by the Nelson-Atkins Museum of Art in Kansas City, Missouri. The Sackler exhibit included a painting done when she was three entitled "Kitty."

By the time she was sixteen, six different books had been written about Wang Yani. They told the story of an innocent girl who loved to paint monkeys, baboons, and cats, and who grew into a world-famous young teen who painted as curators of the Smithsonian watched her create beautiful birds and flowers with her dancing brush.

Wang Yani also exhibited in Germany and grew to love that country in her middle teen years. Studying the German language and winning a scholarship to study art in Germany, in 1996 began to study art at the Academy of Fine Arts Munich. She has had many exhibitions in Germany since 1996, including at Galerie Jaspers.

She is married to photographer Wu Min-an.

References

External links
Wang Yani

Artists from Guangxi
Living people
1975 births
Academy of Fine Arts, Munich alumni
People from Guilin
Child artists